This article lists all of the stations in Canada that are viewable in parts of the United States.

See also 
 List of television stations in Canada by call sign
 List of Canadian television networks (table)
 List of Canadian television channels
 List of Canadian specialty channels
 Category A services
 Category B services
 Category C services
 List of foreign television channels available in Canada
 List of United States television stations available in Canada
 Digital television in Canada
 Multichannel television in Canada
 List of television stations in North America by media market

External links 
 Significantly viewed television stations in the USA, sorted by county (includes Canadian stations)

Television stations in the United States
Television stations in Canada
Lists of television channels in the United States
Television United States